Stephen Self is a British volcanologist, best known for his work on large igneous provinces and on the global impacts of volcanic eruptions.

Education and career
Self graduated from Leeds University in 1970, with a BSc in geology. He then went to Imperial College to study for a PhD on the recent volcanology of Terceira, Azores, supervised by George P. L. Walker. After completing his PhD thesis in 1974, Self moved to New Zealand as a post-doctoral fellow at Victoria University, Wellington, before moving to the United States as a NASA Research Fellow, first at Dartmouth College from 1977 to 1979 and then at the NASA Goddard Institute for Space Studies (1977–1979). He was Assistant Professor at Arizona State University from 1979 to 1983, and later Associate Professor and then Professor at University of Texas, Arlington from 1983 to 1990. In 1990, Self moved to the University of Hawaiʻi at Mānoa, Honolulu as Professor, before returning to the UK in 2001 to take up a Chair in Volcanology at The Open University. From 2008 to 2018, Self worked for the US Nuclear Regulatory Commission as Senior Volcanologist. He is currently adjunct Professor at University of California, Berkeley.

Contributions
Self has made many contributions to volcanology through his research and publications. He is best known for his work on very large eruptions and their impacts. With Christopher G. Newhall he conceived the Volcanic Explosivity Index in 1982, which is still widely used as a comparator of eruption sizes. With Michael R. Rampino, Self developed hypotheses about the links between large explosive volcanic eruptions and climate, and published studies on the large Quaternary eruptions of Toba, Tambora and Krakatoa, among others. With Thor Thordarsson, Self has also written extensively on the Icelandic eruptions of 1783–4, and on the emplacement and inflation of large basaltic lava flows.

Service and recognition
Self was Vice-President of the International Association of Volcanology and Chemistry of the Earth's Interior from 2011-2015. In 2012, he was elected Fellow of the American Geophysical Union; an honour which recognises 'individual members who have made exceptional scientific contributions and attained acknowledged eminence'. He has also been elected Fellow of the Geological Society of America.

References

Year of birth missing (living people)
Living people
20th-century British geologists
21st-century British geologists
British volcanologists
Fellows of the American Geophysical Union
University of Hawaiʻi at Mānoa faculty
Alumni of the University of Leeds
Alumni of Imperial College London